Béguin (or Beguin) is a French surname, which may refer to:

Albert Béguin (1901–1957), Swiss academic and translator
André Béguin, (born 1897), Swiss war criminal and commandant of the World War II Wauwilermoos internment camp
Bernard Béguin (born 1947), French rally driver
Daniel Béguin, French politician
Jean Beguin (1550–1620), French iatrochemist
Louis Beguin-Billecocq (1865–1957), French diplomat and entomologist
Marie Anne Isler Béguin (surname Isler Béguin, born 1956), French politician

See also
8009 Béguin, main belt asteroid
Beguine